Aleksandar Gojković (Serbian Cyrillic: Александар Гојковић; born August 18, 1988) is a Serbian professional footballer who last played for Greek club AEL.

Career
Born in Kraljevo, Gojković made his first football steps with one of the most famous local football schools, Bubamara 1991. Later he moved to Sloga Kraljevo, where he gained fully affirmation, and was captaining the team for some period. During the time he spent with Sloboda Užice, coach Ljubiša Stamenković called him into "Selekcija novinara", football squad made by players from the Serbian SuperLiga competition, for the rival match against Serbia national football team.

Career statistics

Honours
Sloga Kraljevo
Serbian League West (1): 2010–11

References

External links
 
 Aleksandar Gojković stats at utakmica.rs
 Aleksandar Gojković stats at footballdatabase.eu

Living people
1986 births
Association football defenders
Serbian footballers
Serbian expatriate footballers
FK Sloga Kraljevo players
FK Sloboda Užice players
FK Borac Čačak players
FK Radnik Surdulica players
Athlitiki Enosi Larissa F.C. players
Serbian First League players
Serbian SuperLiga players
Super League Greece players
Expatriate footballers in Greece